My Daddy Dearest is a 2012 Philippine television drama series broadcast by GMA Network. Directed by Don Michael Perez, it stars Ogie Alcasid in the title role. It premiered on June 11, 2012 on the network's Telebabad line up replacing Alice Bungisngis and Her Wonder Walis. The series concluded on August 17, 2012 with a total of 50 episodes. It was replaced by Smile, DongHae in its timeslot.

Originally titled as Bongga Ka Tay!, it was inspired by Sebastián Ortega's Lalola.

Premise
The series centers on Bong, played by Ogie Alcasid and his daughter Daisy, played by Milkcah Wynne Nacion. They've never been so close to each other and Bong, being a single parent and has no idea on how to raise his daughter all by himself. Daisy tried her best to get her dad's attention but because of one certain wish, everything goes beyond their imagination which changes Daisy's dad into a woman.

Cast and characters

Lead cast
 Ogie Alcasid as Bong Adonis /Sampaguita /Bong Adonis Clone

Supporting cast
 Jolina Magdangal as Rose Soriano-Adonis / Camilla
 Milkcah Wynne Nacion as Daisy Adonis
 JC Tiuseco as Chris 'CJ' Javier
 Pauleen Luna as Winnie/Annie/Minnie/Reyna Ada/Various Pixie characters
 Pinky Amador as Mercedes Adonis
 Mylene Dizon as Tiandra Soriano
 Kyle Danielle Ocampo as Lily
 Sherilyn Reyes as Daphne
 Pekto as Marco
 Ehra Madrigal as Ivy
 Menggie Cobarrubias as Juancho
 Richard Quan as Bryan
 Jan Manual as Jing
 Neil Ryan Sese as Val
 Nicky Castro as Junior

Ratings
According to AGB Nielsen Philippines' Mega Manila household television ratings, the pilot episode of My Daddy Dearest earned a 14% rating. While the final episode scored a 14.4% rating.

References

External links
 

2012 Philippine television series debuts
2012 Philippine television series endings
Filipino-language television shows
GMA Network drama series
Television shows set in the Philippines